Mikhail Davydovich Volpin (28 December 1902 – 21 July 1988) was a Soviet screenwriter. He is known for his professional partnership with Nikolai Erdman, with whom he was awarded the Stalin Prize in 1950.

Early years 
Volpin was born into an intellectual family: his father, David Samuilovich, was a lawyer; his mother, Anna Borisovna (née Zhislin) was a schoolteacher. He grew up in Moscow, where he was an artistic child. He took drawing lessons from Vasily Surikov. As a young man he was a supporter of the October Revolution and fought in the Russian Civil War for the Red Army. 

From 1920 to 1921 he worked at the Russian Telegraph Agency as a writer and designer of satirical propaganda posters (so-called Rosta Windows), under the direction of Vladimir Mayakovsky. 

From 1921 to 1927 he was a student at Vkhutemas, where he wrote satirical poems and comic plays, including collaborations with Viktor Ardov, Ilya Ilf, Yevgeny Petrov, Valentin Kataev, Vladimir Mass, and Nikolai Erdman.

In 1933, he was arrested by the OGPU, along with Erdman and Mass, and charged with writing "anti-Soviet fables". He spent the next four years in a prison camp in the arctic. After his release in 1937, he reunited with Erdman and they began a screenwriting partnership that would last until Erdman's death in 1970. Their professional collaboration was based on an enduring but asymmetrical friendship, in which Erdman always treated Volpin as an inferior. The two men shared an interest in horse racing and equestrianism, and several of their scripts involve horses and horsemanship as plot devices. 

Before the war, Volpin married Irina Glebovna Barteneva (1918–2004), to whom he remained married until his death.

In 1941, at the outbreak of the Great Patriotic War, Volpin and Erdman were in Ryazan. Due to their history as political prisoners, they were unable to enlist in the ordinary way. Instead, they had to travel by foot to Tolyatti, a distance of over 600 kilometers, in order to enlist in a special unit for disenfranchised persons and former priests. During the trek, Volpin bartered for their food and lodgings by painting portraits of local peasants. Volpin and Erdman were only briefly exposed to the war. By January 1942, as a result of Erdman's connections to Lavrenty Beria, they obtained a transfer to Moscow, where they were assigned to write patriotic material for the Song and Dance Ensemble at the Central Club of the NKVD.

Post-war career 
From 1948 to 1971, Volpin produced scripts and lyrics to the animation studio Soyuzmultfilm, notably The Enchanted Boy, The Story of a Crime, It Was I Who Drew the Little Man, and The Key. The latter attracted the attention of Soviet censors, due to its negative portrayal of social conformity. 

Volpin wrote eighteen feature-film screenplays, half of them in collaboration with Nikolai Erdman. In 1950, they were awarded the Stalin Prize for their work on Brave People, along with director Konstantin Yudin, cinematographer Igor Geleyn, and actors Sergei Gurzo and Aleksei Gribov. More familiar to contemporary audiences are Volpin's contributions to the fantasy genre: Jack Frost and Fire, Water, and Brass Pipes, both directed by Aleksandr Rou. 

Volpin worked actively until shortly before his death in a traffic accident in 1988. He was buried in Vvedenskoye Cemetery in Moscow.

Feature films (as screenwriter and lyricist) 

 1938 – Volga-Volga (Волга-Волга) – with Nikolai Erdman and Grigori Aleksandrov
 1940 – Shining Path (Светлый путь) – lyricist, with Anatoly D'Aktil
 1940 – The Old Horseman (Старый наездник)
 1943 – The Actress (Актриса) – with Nikolai Erdman
 1945 – Hello Moscow! (Здравствуй, Москва!) – with Nikolai Erdman
 1949 – Cossacks of the Kuban (Кубанские казаки) – lyricist, with Mikhail Isakovsky
 1950 – Brave People (Смелые люди) – with Nikolai Erdman (for which the duo won the Stalin Prize) 
 1951 – Lofty Hill (Высокая горка)
 1951 – Sporting Honour (Спортивная честь) – with Nikolai Erdman
 1953 – Mountain Outpost (Застава в горах) – with Nikolai Erdman
 1956 – On the Stage (На подмостках сцены)
 1957 – Guttaperchevyy malchik (Гуттаперчевый мальчик)
 1957 – Tales of Lenin (Рассказы о Ленине) – with Nikolai Erdman and Yevgeny Gabrilovich
 1964 – Jack Frost (Морозко) – with Nikolai Erdman
 1967 – Fire, Water, and Brass Pipes (Огонь, вода и… медные трубы) – with Nikolai Erdman
 1974 – Prince Prosha (Царевич Проша)
 1976 – How Ivanushka the Fool Travelled in Search of Wonder (Как Иванушка-дурачок за чудом ходил)
 1979 – Nightingale (Соловей) – adapted from the story by Hans Christian Andersen
 1982 – Donkeyskin (Ослиная шкура) – adapted from the story by Charles Perrault
 1986 – The Tale of the Painter's Lover (Сказка про влюблённого маляра) – with Valeri Frid

References

External links 
 

1902 births
1988 deaths
People from Mogilev
People from Mogilyovsky Uyezd (Mogilev Governorate)
Belarusian Jews
Soviet screenwriters
Male screenwriters
Russian satirists
Prisoners and detainees of the Soviet Union
Stalin Prize winners
Road incident deaths in the Soviet Union